Tegueste is a town and a municipality of the northeastern part of the island of Tenerife in the Santa Cruz de Tenerife province, on the Canary Islands, Spain. It is surrounded by the municipality of San Cristóbal de La Laguna. The town Tegueste is located 4 km northwest of San Cristóbal de La Laguna and 11 km northwest of the island capital Santa Cruz de Tenerife. Tegueste became independent from San Cristóbal de La Laguna in the 17th century.

Currently, it is thought that the place name Tegueste is related to Thagaste, a city in northern Africa where Saint Augustine of Hippo was born and a center of Berber culture.

Historical population

See also
List of municipalities in Santa Cruz de Tenerife

References 

Municipalities in Tenerife